The Golden Gate Fortune Cookie Factory is a fortune cookie company with its main entrance off Ross Alley, between Jackson Street and Washington Street in the Chinatown neighborhood of San Francisco, California in the United States. In 2011, Wired voted the company as one of their top ten "geekiest" places in San Francisco.

The cookie company was opened in 1962. It is owned by Franklin Yee. They make traditional fortune cookies, as well as chocolate flavored fortune cookies, almond cookies, and other sweets. Visitors can observe workers using motorized circular griddles to create fortune cookies, which they sell for $5 a bag or flat cookies for $3 a bag (March 2015). The company also makes "fortuneless" cookies. They charge 50 cents for photographs of the workers and the factory interior.

Gallery

References

External links

Golden Gate Fortune Cookie from the official Chinatown, San Francisco, website

Manufacturing companies based in San Francisco
Tourist attractions in San Francisco
Chinatown, San Francisco
Food and drink in the San Francisco Bay Area
Bakeries of California